Albert Patfield (6 September 1884 – 9 November 1961) was an Australian cricketer. He played three first-class matches for Western Australia between 1908/09 and 1909/10.

See also
 List of Western Australia first-class cricketers

References

External links
 

1884 births
1961 deaths
Australian cricketers
Western Australia cricketers